The NMBS/SNCB Class 28 number series has been brought back into use for 43 Bombardier TRAXX locomotives which have been hired from Angel Trains Cargo for use with B-Cargo, the freight division of NMBS/SNCB, since renamed Lineas. They are numbered in two series - they carry their original numbers, E186 123 to E186 125, and E186 196 to E186 220, and have also been numbered into the SNCB number series, 2801 to 2843.

It was planned that they would work passenger services between Amsterdam, Brecht, Brussels and Antwerp. Several are now running on push-pull Benelux trains, alongside NS Class 186 (NS TRAXX F140 MS). These trains have a locomotive at each end ; some trains feature a Class 186 at one end and a Class 28 at the other one.

They also work on the heavy freight corridor between Aachen-West, Antwerp, and Zeebrugge.

The original Class 28 locomotives were produced by Baume-Marpent in 1949.

Class 29
5 TRAXX F140 MS locomotives especially prepared for operations into France were numbered 2901 to 2905.

2901 ex E 186 346-3
2902 ex E 186 347-1 (now with Fret SNCF) 
2903 ex E 186 348-9
2904 ex E 186 349-7
2905 ex E 186 350-5

2861 & 2862
During 2015 two additional TRAXX F140 MS locomotives were hired by SNCB and numbered as 2861 & 2862.

2861 ex E 186 183-0 
2862 ex E 186 181-4 

They have been joined by E 186 424, covering for locomotives away for maintenance.

References

External links

 SNCB Class 28 profile on Trainspo

National Railway Company of Belgium locomotives
1500 V DC locomotives
3000 V DC locomotives
15 kV AC locomotives
25 kV AC locomotives
Electric locomotives of Belgium
TRAXX
Standard gauge locomotives of Belgium
Railway locomotives introduced in 2007